St. John's Abbey may refer to:
St. John's Abbey, Colchester, England
St. John's Abbey, Kilkenny, Ireland
Saint John Abbey, Müstair, Switzerland 
Saint John's Abbey, Collegeville, Minnesota
St. John's Abbey in the Thurtal, Switzerland
St. John's Abbey, Bremen, Germany
Alling Abbey, Denmark

See also
St. John's Priory (disambiguation)